Ayaminami Dam  is a gravity dam located in Miyazaki Prefecture in Japan. The dam is used for flood control and power production. The catchment area of the dam is 101 km2. The dam impounds about 136  ha of land when full and can store 38000 thousand cubic meters of water. The construction of the dam was started on 1953 and completed in 1958.

See also
List of dams in Japan

References

Dams in Miyazaki Prefecture